Zboj is a village and municipality in Snina District in the Prešov Region of north-eastern Slovakia.

History
In historical records the village was first mentioned in 1567.

Geography
The municipality lies at an altitude of 356 metres and covers an area of 50.542 km². According to the 2013 census it had a population of 353 inhabitants.

References

External links
 
 
https://web.archive.org/web/20071116010355/http://www.statistics.sk/mosmis/eng/run.html
Village of Zboj at Eastern Slovakia Research Strategies
Zboj at Snina Region Tourism

Villages and municipalities in Snina District
Zemplín (region)